The 1999 FIA GT Zhuhai 500 km was the tenth and final round the 1999 FIA GT Championship season.  It took place at the Zhuhai International Circuit, China, on November 26, 1999.

As with the previous two FIA GT events in the United States, a second class of cars was allowed to compete in order to help fill the field.  These cars, designated as National GT (N-GT), were cars from smaller national championships.  They were not eligible for points.

Official results
Class winners are in bold.  Cars failing to complete 70% of winner's distance are marked as Not Classified (NC).

Statistics
 Pole position – #2 Viper Team Oreca – 1:47.576
 Fastest lap – #2 Viper Team Oreca – 1:47.717
 Average speed – 171.297 km/h

References

 

Z
6 Hours of Zhuhai
1999 in Chinese motorsport